Juliet Roberts (born 6 May 1962) is a British jazz, rock, soul and house music singer of Grenadian descent.

Career
Roberts was born in London, England. She originally recorded as Julie Roberts in 1982, and performed on the 1983 top 10 hit single "It's Over" by Funk Masters. In July 1983, she released the single "Fool for You" backed with "It's Been a Long, Long Time" on the Bluebird Records label, catalogue reference BRT3. The single peaked at No. 77 on the Gallup chart, week ending 20 August 1983.

In 1984, Roberts began a four-year stint as vocalist for the jazz group Working Week. She also released another single on Bluebird, "The Old Rugged Cross" b/w "I'm So Glad". In 1986, she released "Ain't You Had Enough Love", a cover of a Phyllis Hyman recording. The same year, Roberts also presented Channel 4's Solid Soul programme with Chris Forbes.

In 1990, she provided backing vocals on Cathy Dennis's Move to This album, as well as on Breathe's album Peace of Mind.

Roberts collaborated with British house group L.A. Mix on their two albums, On the Side and Coming Back for More in 1989 and 1990 respectively. She appears on several tracks, among them the single "We Shouldn't Hold Hands in the Dark", which reached No. 69 in the UK Singles Chart in 1991. The mastermind behind L.A. Mix was British DJ, producer and songwriter Les Adams.

In 1992, Roberts provided backing vocals on Dannii Minogue's single "Love's on Every Corner" (which was written by Cathy Dennis, and produced by Danny D, a.k.a. D Mob). Roberts' next release was in 1993 as a dance music artist, with the hit single "I Want You": A number one on the US dance charts and No. 44 U.S. Billboard Hot 100) and the house music offering, "Caught in the Middle", which also went to number one on the dance chart. An album, Natural Thing, followed in 1994. Roberts has also taught British television viewers vocal performance basics on the UK's Rockschool TV series. In addition to her solo and musical ensemble projects, she is in demand as a backing vocalist. Since 1997, she has had three UK top 20 hits: "So Good", "Bad Girls" and "Needin U II".

Discography

Albums

Singles

As lead artist

As featured artist

See also
List of number-one dance hits (United States)
List of artists who reached number one on the US Dance chart

References

External links

1962 births
Living people
20th-century Black British women singers
21st-century Black British women singers
British dance musicians
British women jazz singers
English house musicians
English people of Grenadian descent
English women in electronic music
Reprise Records artists
Video game musicians
Working Week (band) members